Leonai Souza de Almeida (born 28 April 1995), simply known as Leonai, is a Brazilian footballer who plays as a midfielder for Ecuadorian club Barcelona SC, on loan from Uruguayan club Plaza Colonia.

Club career

Early career
Born in Pontal, São Paulo, Leonai played for Olé Brasil as a youth, and made his senior debut with Jaboticabal in 2016, playing for the side in a non-official tournament called . He was announced by Sete de Dourados in January 2017, but spent only 40 days at the club before leaving. During that period, he also worked as a stock boy in a supermarket and as an assistant in a chemical laboratory.

On 26 April 2017, Leonai joined Taquaritinga. After impressing with the side in the year's Campeonato Paulista Segunda Divisão, he was announced at Comercial-SP on 16 January 2018.

On 17 October 2018, after helping Comercial in their promotion to the Campeonato Paulista Série A3, Leonai renewed his contract until 2020. He scored his first goal for the club the following 6 April, netting the winner in a 1–0 success over Desportivo Brasil.

Plaza Colonia
On 6 November 2019, Comercial confirmed the transfer of Leonai to Uruguayan club Plaza Colonia. He made his professional – and Primera División – debut on 7 March 2020, coming on as a second-half substitute for Leandro Suhr in a 1–1 home draw against Fénix.

Leonai became a regular starter for the Patas Blancas, and scored his first professional goal on 28 June 2021, netting the opener in a 1–1 home draw against Cerro Largo. At the end of that season, he was chosen as the best foreign player of the tournament by Referí, the football section of newspaper El Observador.

Loan to Barcelona SC
On 10 January 2022, Ecuadorian Serie A side Barcelona SC announced that Leonai had joined the club on a one-year loan deal, with a buyout clause.

Career statistics

Honours

Individual
Uruguayan Primera División Team of the season: 2021

References

External links

1995 births
Living people
Footballers from São Paulo (state)
Brazilian footballers
Association football midfielders
Clube Atlético Taquaritinga players
Comercial Futebol Clube (Ribeirão Preto) players
Uruguayan Primera División players
Plaza Colonia players
Ecuadorian Serie A players
Barcelona S.C. footballers
Brazilian expatriate footballers
Brazilian expatriate sportspeople in Uruguay
Brazilian expatriate sportspeople in Ecuador
Expatriate footballers in Uruguay
Expatriate footballers in Ecuador